Peasants' Union or Peasant Union may refer to:

Peasant Union (Lithuania) (1905–1922), political party in Lithuania
Lithuanian Popular Peasants' Union (1922–1936), political party in Lithuania
Peasant Union of Slovenia, former name of Slovenian People's Party, a political party in Slovenia
International Peasants' Union, international organization